Nozim Nosyrovich Babadjanov (born on 7 August 1995) is a Tajik professional footballer who plays as an attacking midfielder for the Tajikistan national team.

Career

Club
Babadjanov started his career in the youth team of Rubin Kazan, before moving to Lokomotiv Moscow's youth team in 2014. At the beginning of 2015, Babadjanov signed for Regar-TadAZ in his native Tajikistan, before a year later, on 11 January 2016, FC Istiklol announced that they had signed Babadjanov on a three-year contract from Regar-TadAZ in preparation for their 2016 AFC Cup campaign.

On 18 January 2017, Babadjanov signed a six-month contract with Bahraini Premier League club Bahrain SC

On 28 February 2019, Babadjanov's contract with Istiklol was terminated by mutual consent.

Real Kashmir
In July 2022, Babadjanov moved to India and signed with I-League club Real Kashmir, on a one-year deal.

International 
Babadjanov made his debut for Tajikistan on 8 October 2015 against Kyrgyzstan.

Career statistics

Club

International

Honours

Istiklol
 Tajik League: 2016
 Tajik Cup: 2016
 Tajik Supercup: 2016, 2018

References

1996 births
Living people
Tajikistani footballers
Tajikistani expatriate footballers
Tajikistan international footballers
FC Istiklol players
FC Chernomorets Balchik players
Expatriate footballers in Bahrain
Expatriate footballers in Bulgaria
Association football midfielders
Tajikistan Higher League players
FC Lokomotiv Moscow players
FC Rubin Kazan players
Tajikistani expatriate sportspeople in Bahrain
Real Kashmir FC players